The languages of Portugal are Portuguese, Mirandese and Portuguese Sign Language.
Historically, Celtic and Lusitanian were spoken in what is now Portugal.

Modern

Portuguese is practically universal in Portugal, but there are some specificities.

Dialects of Portuguese in Portugal
 Alentejan Portuguese 
 Algarvean Portuguese
 Azorean Portuguese (micaelense)
 Beiran Portuguese 
 Estremaduran Portuguese
 Galician Portuguese (interâmnico)
 Madeiran Portuguese
Barranquenho – In the town of Barrancos (in the border between Extremadura, Andalusia and Portugal), a dialect of Portuguese heavily influenced by Spanish is spoken, known as Barranquenho.
Caló language – spoken by the Romani people in Portugal
Minderico – a sociolect or argot spoken in Minde, practically extinct
Mirandese language – A dialect of Astur-Leonese spoken in Miranda do Douro in northeastern Portugal, recognized officially as a minority language in 1999.
Portuguese Sign Language

Historically
Other languages have been extensively spoken in the territory of modern Portugal:

Pre-Roman languages

Proto-Celtic & Celtic languages
Celtiberian language
Gallaecian language
Tartessian language
Lusitanian language

Roman, Post-Roman and Medieval languages
Arabic language
Andalusi Arabic
Classical Arabic
Berber languages
Germanic languages
Gothic language
Suebi language
Vandalic language
Latin language
Vulgar Latin
Iberian Romance languages
Galician-Portuguese
Astur-Leonese
Mirandese language
Mozarabic languages
Judeo-Romance languages
Judeo-Portuguese
Scythian languages
Alanic language

See also

Iberian languages
Languages of Spain
Iberian Romance languages

References

External links
Detailed map of the Pre-Roman Peoples of Iberia (around 200 BC)
Detailed linguistic map of the Iberian Peninsula

 
Portuguese language
Paleohispanic languages
Extinct languages of Europe